Ximenes Chapel (Chapel of the Miracles) is a historic chapel at 113 Ruiz Street in San Antonio, Texas.

The chapel has long been an important gathering place for San Antonio's Mexican-American and Hispanic Catholic population.

The chapel was rebuilt in the 1920s to replace the original chapel from 1813, which had been destroyed in a fire. It was added to the National Register of Historic Places in 1980.

References

Churches completed in 1860
Roman Catholic churches in San Antonio
Hispanic and Latino American culture in San Antonio
Mexican-American culture in San Antonio
National Register of Historic Places in San Antonio
Properties of religious function on the National Register of Historic Places in Texas
Spanish-American culture in Texas